The Nasib Border Crossing is an international border crossing between Syria and Jordan. It is one of the busiest border crossings in Syria and is situated on the Damascus-Amman international highway near Nasib, Syria. It is the main crossing for Syrian exports to Jordan and the GCC countries. In April 2015, the crossing fell to control of Free Syrian Army and al-Nusra Front during the Battle of Nasib Border Crossing. On 6 July 2018, the Syrian army recaptured the Nasib Border Crossing in the 2018 Southern Syria offensive.

The Nasib Border Crossing was officially reopened on 15 October 2018.

After closing again due to the COVID pandemic in 2020, as well as the 2021 Daraa clashes, the Nasib Border Crossing reopened on 29 September 2021.

References

Jordan–Syria border crossings